Jinyidong Line of the Jinhua Rail Transit is a suburban rapid transit line in Jinhua, Zhejiang Province, China. The name Jinyidong is derived from the first characters of Jinhua, Yiwu and Dongyang. The line is colored red on official system maps.

Jinyidong line consist of two sections, Jinyi section (Jinhua to Yiwu) and Yidong section (Yiwu to Dongyang). Jinyi section opened on 30 August 2022, and part of Yidong section, from Lingyun to Sports Center, is opened in 28 December 2022.

Stations

Jinyi section

Yidong section

References

Jinyidong
Rapid transit lines in China
Railway lines opened in 2022